Super Hits is a compilation album by hip-hop group Cypress Hill. It was released in 2008 and forms part of Sony Music's budget Super Hits series. The album consists of single and album tracks taken from Cypress Hill, Black Sunday, Skull & Bones and Till Death Do Us Part. Although not noted as such, all tracks are the 'clean' versions and have all profanity removed.

Track listing

Notes
How I Could Just Kill a Man is the 'clean' 12" version.
Insane in the Brain and When the Ship Goes Down are the 'clean' Radio Versions.
Dr. Greenthumb is the 'Clean Radio Edit'.
All other tracks are the 'clean' album versions.

Cypress Hill albums
Albums produced by DJ Muggs
2008 greatest hits albums